The Bhartiya Gau Raksha Dal is a Hindu nationalist and right-wing federation of cattle protection movements in India affiliated with the Rashtriya Swayamsevak Sangh and a member of the Sangh Parivar. It provides guidance and support in the construction of protective shelters for cattle and is supporting cattle protection movements all over India. This organization is not affiliated with any political party, its members are all volunteers and it was founded in 2012 by Pawan Pandit.

Activities 
In supporting the creation of new cattle protection groups, (it often has attendant vigilante paramilitary links), the organization has already set up more than 32 groups in different Indian states. It has spearheaded a campaign against the killing of cattle, filling many complaints against those who were found to be killers. A member of the group was appointed to the cattle protection state committee in Punjab, strengthening the group's influence. They openly participate in television debates and public meetings to support cattle protection groups, such as in the Akhlaq murder case.

On June 25, 2016, two organization members were allegedly shot by cattle smugglers, and on July 27, the Indian news channel, NDTV, aired a debate in which it was reported by Pawan Pandit that 100 volunteers in the cattle protection movement were shot by cattle smugglers. Later, he further said that approximately 44,000 cases of cattle smuggling have occurred in all of India, however, the media didn't broadcast anything about it.

On July 31, 2016, NDTV has aired a report which shows a group of organization members forcibly stopping a truck on the outskirts of Pune, Maharashtra, yanking the driver out, snatching his phone, and pushing his truck to a police station. The report further elaborates on how the so-called "cattle protectors" and other activists can be bribed to guarantee safe passage for cattle transporters.

The BGRD founder, Pawan Pandit apparently claims to condemn any violence, stating that the organization is against the violence and is working on social ground with the police, yet there's investigative media stating that vigilantes don't have a right to police anyone.

See also 

 Cow Protection Movement
 Hindutva
Cow vigilante violence in India

References

External links 

  

Organizations established in 2012
Hindutva
Volunteer organisations in India
Hindu nationalism
Political organisations based in India
Sangh Parivar
2012 establishments in India
Animal welfare organisations based in India
Cattle welfare organisations based in India
Hinduism-related controversies
Right-wing populism in India
Hindu organisations based in India
Hinduism and cattle